Pete's Brewing Company was founded by homebrewer Pete Slosberg and Mark Bronder in 1986.  Its major product line was Pete's Wicked Ale, an American Brown Ale that is 5.3% alcohol by volume. The company was acquired by the Gambrinus Company in 1998, a company that owns the Spoetzl Brewery in Texas, the Bridgeport Brewery in Oregon and the Trumer Brauerei in Berkeley. In 2004, Pete's Brewing Company was number 42 in America for sales by volume.

Brand discontinuation
Pete's Wicked Ales's brand owner, The Gambrinus Company, discontinued the Pete's Wicked Ale brand in 2011, sending letters to their distributors citing "rapidly declining sales volumes".

See also
 List of defunct breweries in the United States

References

American beer brands
Beer brewing companies based in Texas
Defunct brewery companies of the United States